Maratus spicatus is a species of the genus Maratus (peacock spiders), an Australian member of the jumping spider family. It was described in 2012 and is native to Western Australia.

Image gallery

References

Salticidae
Spiders of Australia
Spiders described in 2012